
Hawke may refer to:

 Hawke (surname)

In fiction
 Hawke (film), a 2010 Australian television film about Bob Hawke
 Hawke (novel), a 2003 novel by Ted Bell
 Hawke (Advance Wars), a fictional commander first introduced in Advance Wars 2: Black Hole Rising
 Hawke (Dragon Age), a prominent character from the Dragon Age video game series
 Hawke, a fictional character in the video game Romancing SaGa
 Cannon Hawke, comic book character
 Connor Hawke, comic book character
 Jeff Hawke, a science fiction comic strip
 Elizabeth Hawke, protagonist/antagonist in the Australian series Wicked Science

Places
 Hawke Bay, a bay on the North Island of New Zealand
 Hawke's Bay, the area surrounding Hawke Bay, New Zealand
 Hawke's Bay (Karachi), a beach and neighborhood in Karachi, Pakistan
 Hawke's Bay Province, a historical province of New Zealand 
 Hawke (New Zealand electorate), a historical parliamentary electorate of New Zealand 
 Mount Hawke, village in Cornwall, England, U.K.
 Hawke (crater), a lunar impact crater on the southern hemisphere on the far side of the Moon
 Division of Hawke, Australian electoral division
 Hawkesdale, Victoria, Australia
 Hawksdale, a location in Cumbria, England, sometimes called "Hawkesdale"

Ships
 , the name of various British Royal Navy ships

Organisations
 Hawke Sea Scouts, a Scouting unit in Auckland, New Zealand.
 Hawke Racing Cars, a defunct Formula Ford racing car constructor
 Hawke Coachwork, a defunct coachbuilder

Animals 
 A historical alternative spelling for hawk